Orictites is a genus of beetles in the family Carabidae, containing the following species:

 Orictites ampliosetosus Balkenohl, 2017
 Orictites anteriorlatus Balkenohl, 2017
 Orictites anteriortenuis Balkenohl, 2017
 Orictites barclayi Balkenohl, 2017
 Orictites brancuccii Balkenohl, 2017
 Orictites charleshuberi Balkenohl, 2017
 Orictites costulipennis (H. W. Bates, 1892)
 Orictites desuntsetosus Balkenohl, 2017
 Orictites minotaur Andrewes, 1931
 Orictites mjoebergi Louwerens, 1964
 Orictites omnipunctatus Balkenohl, 2017
 Orictites orbachi Bulirsch & Magrini, 2022
 Orictites plurisetosus Balkenohl, 2017
 Orictites tubercucollis Balkenohl, 2017

References

Scaritinae